Ağarx (also, Ağarax) is a village and municipality in the Agsu Rayon of Azerbaijan. It has a population of 997.

References 

Populated places in Agsu District